Burunge may refer to:
the Burunge people
the Burunge language